Crna River ( / Црна ријека, "Black River") is one of the right-hand tributaries of the Vrbanja River in Bosnia and Herzegovina. It rises on the western slopes of Uzlomac (at about 450 m).

The only significant tributary of Crna River is Dugi Creek (Dugi potok / Дуги поток, "Long Creek"), which is longer than itself. Its mouth is at the town of the same name, Crna River, on the M4 road (Banja Luka – Kotor Varoš – Matuzići – Doboj).  Its lower course is the border between Čelinac and Kotor Varoš municipalities.

References

Rivers of Bosnia and Herzegovina